Caroline Truong (born 8 November 1980 in Croix, France) is a French former competitive ice dancer. With Sylvain Longchambon, she won two silver medals on the 1999–2000 ISU Junior Grand Prix series, bronze at the 2001 Ondrej Nepela Memorial, and bronze at the 2002 French Championships.  She participated in the 2001 University Winter Olympics in Zakopan Poland.

Competitive highlights 
(with Longchambon for France)

GP: Grand Prix; JGP: Junior Grand Prix (Junior Series)

Programs 
(with Longchambon)

References 

Living people
1980 births
French female ice dancers
Competitors at the 2001 Winter Universiade